Marcel Mao (born 1937) is a French former football manager.

Career
At the age of 16, Mao joined the first team of Quimper Kerfeunteun.

In 1982-1983 he was the assistant coach of the French national U17 team.

After working as head coach of Quimper Kerfeunteun, Wallis and Futuna, Chad, and New Caledonia, he was appointed head coach of Tafea in Vanuatu to help them prepare for the OFC Champions League.

Personal life

He is the father of Philippe Mao.

References

External links
 

Living people
1937 births
French footballers
French football managers
Chad national football team managers
New Caledonia national football team managers
Association footballers not categorized by position
French expatriate football managers
French expatriate sportspeople in Chad
French expatriate sportspeople in Vanuatu
Expatriate football managers in Vanuatu